General Sir James Newton Rodney Moore,  (9 June 1905 – 19 May 1985), usually known as Sir Rodney Moore, was a senior British Army officer. He fought in the Second World War and Palestine Emergency, and was General Officer Commanding London District from 1957 to 1959. Moore was appointed the inaugural Chief of Malaysian Armed Forces Staff from 1959 to 1965, a post he occupied during the final stages of the Malayan Emergency and early period of the Indonesia–Malaysia confrontation. His final posting was as Defence Services Secretary from 1964 to 1966.

Early life and education
Moore was born in Bunbury, Western Australia, on 9 June 1905, the son of Major General Sir Newton Moore and his wife, Isabel Lowrie. He was educated at Harrow School and the Royal Military College, Sandhurst.

Military career

After passing out from Sandhurst, he was commissioned as a second lieutenant into the Grenadier Guards on 29 January 1925. During the Second World War, from 1942 to 1944, he was a General Staff Officer (GSO) with the Guards Armoured Division. He was then Commanding Officer of the 2nd Battalion, Grenadier Guards, in North-West Europe. In 1945 he assumed command of the 8th Infantry Brigade in Germany and Palestine. From 1946 to 1947 he was commander of the 1st Guards Brigade, also in Palestine, during the Palestine Emergency.

Returning to the United Kingdom in 1948, Moore was Chief of Staff of London District until 1950, and then attended the Imperial Defence College.

From 1951 to 1953 Moore was Deputy Adjutant-General, British Army of the Rhine, Germany. Moore then undertook his first NATO posting, as Chief of Staff Allied Forces Northern Europe. Returning to the Middle East in 1955, Moore was General Officer Commanding (GOC) 1st Infantry Division. He was then transferred, in the same year, to command the 10th Armoured Division.

Returning to London in 1957, Moore assumed the post of Major-General commanding the Household Brigade and London District. Another overseas posting in 1959 saw him serving as Chief of Armed Forces Staff (now known as Chief of Defence Forces), Malaya and Director of Border Operations, Malaya. For his service in this role, Moore was appointed an honorary Commander of the Order of the Defender of the Realm by the Malayan government in 1961. His last active appointment was as the first Defence Services Secretary at the Ministry of Defence in London. He retired in 1966.

From 1965 to 1966 Moore was Aide-de-Camp General to The Queen. Moore spent his last years as Chief Steward of Hampton Court Palace.

Moore was also a Gentleman Usher to the Royal Household.

References

External links
Generals of World War II

|-
 

|-

|-

|-

 
|-

1905 births
1985 deaths
Military personnel from Western Australia
Graduates of the Royal College of Defence Studies
British Army generals
British Army brigadiers of World War II
British Army personnel of the Malayan Emergency
British military personnel of the Palestine Emergency
Commanders of the Order of the British Empire
Companions of the Distinguished Service Order
Graduates of the Royal Military College, Sandhurst
Grenadier Guards officers
Knights Commander of the Order of the Bath
Knights Grand Cross of the Royal Victorian Order
Grand Crosses with Star and Sash of the Order of Merit of the Federal Republic of Germany
People educated at Harrow School
People from Bunbury, Western Australia